Rosecrans is an unincorporated community along Rosecrans Road (Illinois Route 173) just west of U.S. Route 41 in northern Lake County, Illinois,  south of the Wisconsin state line and  west of Lake Michigan.  The community is named for American Civil War General William Starke Rosecrans. The business district is at the intersection of IL 173 and US 41, east of the residential community.

References

Unincorporated communities in Lake County, Illinois
Unincorporated communities in Illinois